Robert Horace Walpole, 5th Earl of Orford (10 July 1854 – 27 September 1931) was a British peer, Foreign Office diplomat, soldier, and Royal Navy officer.

Background
The son of Commander Hon. Frederick Walpole (1822–1876), R.N., M.P. for North Norfolk (son of Horatio Walpole, 3rd Earl of Orford) and his cousin Laura Sophia Frances, daughter of Francis Walpole (grandson of Horatio Walpole, 1st Baron Walpole and nephew of Horatio Walpole, 1st Earl of Orford), Orford succeeded to the earldom on the death of his uncle, on 7 December 1894. He was educated at Eton.

Career
Orford was a Lieutenant in the Royal Navy, serving on HMS Blanche on the Australian station in the early 1870s, from where he visited New Zealand, New Guinea, Fiji and other Pacific Islands. He was later commissioned a Captain, 4th Battalion, Norfolk Regiment. He was part of the Earl of Rosslyn's Special Embassy to the wedding of King Alfonso XII of Spain and Mercedes of Orléans on 9 January 1878, returning 6 February that year. On 10 August 1878, he was attached as private secretary to his cousin Sir Henry Drummond Wolff, H.M. Commissioner to Eastern Rumelia, and served in that same capacity on Wolff's assignment to Egypt in 1885.

He was a Deputy Lieutenant and Justice of the Peace.

Personal life
Orford married firstly, 17 May 1888, Louisa (d. 1909), daughter of D. C. Corbin, of New York, United States; they had a son, Horatio Corbin Walpole, who died in 1893 aged two years, and a daughter, Dorothy (1889–1959). He married secondly, 15 September 1917, Emily Gladys (1891–1988), daughter of Rev. Thomas Henry Royal Oakes, rector of Thurgarton, Norfolk. Their elder daughter, Gladys, died in 1919 aged less than a year; the second daughter, Anne (1919–2019) was a horticulturist, and married firstly, in 1939, Colonel Joseph Eric Palmer (1903–1980), CBE, TD, with whom she had two sons; she married secondly, in 1990, the dendrologist Robert James Berry (1916–2018).

References

1854 births
1931 deaths
British diplomats
Deputy Lieutenants of Norfolk
Earls in the Peerage of the United Kingdom
English justices of the peace
People educated at Eton College
Royal Navy officers
Horatio
Earls of Orford